Dreux Pierre Frédéric (born November 26, 1985) better known by his stage name Lil' Fizz, is an American rapper, singer, songwriter and actor best known for being the youngest member and rapper of the R&B group B2K. Formerly, he starred on the television show Love & Hip Hop: Hollywood.

Early life
Frédéric was born in New Orleans, Louisiana and raised in Los Angeles, California. He is of Louisiana Creole heritage.

Career
Known as the rapper of the group, Lil' Fizz was a member of B2K from 2000 to 2004. After the group broke up, he began his independent rap career.
His debut EP, Payday, was released on July 17, 2007, on iTunes as a digital download release.

He reconnected with former fellow B2K member J-Boog and long time friend and business manager Damuer H. Leffridge to launch a new record label, Popular Entertainment. Under Popular Ent., they released a 5-song EP titled Night Life, available for digital download on iTunes in September 2009.

Personal life
He has a son, Kameron, born in 2010, with Moniece Slaughter. He and Slaughter have both appeared on Love & Hip Hop: Hollywood since its inception in 2014.

In season 6 (2019), Fizz revealed that he was in a romantic relationship with Apryl Jones, who was a fellow Love & Hip Hop cast member and the ex-girlfriend and babies' mother of fellow B2K member Omarion. As of 2020, he and Apryl have ended their relationship. Lingering issues between the two were addressed in VH1 Family Reunion: Love & Hip Hop Edition, which was filmed in 2020 during the COVID-19 pandemic and aired in 2021.

He also appeared in Marriage Boot Camp: Hip-Hop Edition in 2019 with his girlfriend at that time, Tiffany Campbell.

Discography

Extended plays
 2007: Payday
 2009: Night Life (with J-Boog)

Singles 
 2006:  Fluid 
 2007: Beds (featuring Ray J)
 2009: Bounce (with J-Boog)
 2013: Becky
 2014: Famous (featuring Fresco Kane)
 2015: Good Lotion
 2019: Mirror

Filmography

Films
 2004: You Got Served – Rashann
 2009: Steppin: The Movie – Jay
 2014: Hype Nation 3D – Tommy
 2022: Run Nixon - Dre

Television 
 2002: All That – musical guest with B2K
 2005: Pranksta (unaired) – host
 2005–2007: The War at Home – Taye
 2014–2016 (main cast), 2017–2019 (supporting cast): Love & Hip Hop: Hollywood on VH1
 2019: All American (2 episodes, MC) 
 2019–present: Marriage Boot Camp on WE TV
 2021: VH1 Family Reunion: Love & Hip Hop Edition on VH1

References

External links
 
 

1985 births
African-American male rappers
Louisiana Creole people
B2K members
Living people
Rappers from Los Angeles
West Coast hip hop musicians
African-American songwriters
Songwriters from California
Participants in American reality television series
21st-century American rappers
21st-century American male musicians
21st-century African-American musicians
20th-century African-American people
American male songwriters